Sackets Harbor Battlefield State Historic Site is a historically important location in Jefferson County, New York, United States.  The historic site is south of the Village of Sackets Harbor, bordering Lake Ontario in the Town of Hounsfield. Two battles were fought near this location during the War of 1812. Some 3,000 men worked at the shipyard building warships, and the village was fortified and garrisoned with thousands of troops. 

The site includes exhibits, a restored 1850s Navy Yard and Commandant's House, outdoor signs, and guided and self-guided tours. During the summer months, interpretive guides, in  regimental style, re-enact a soldier's camp life in 1813.

It was listed on the National Register of Historic Places in 1974. The battlefield designation includes the 24-acre Horse Island, the site of some British action during the Second Battle of Sacket's Harbor. In July 2017, the Civil War Trust announced that it had acquired the island for preservation, under the first grant in the United States made for a War of 1812 site by the National Park Service's American Battlefield Land Grant program.

See also 
 Battle of Sacket's Harbor
 List of New York State Historic Sites
 Horse Island Light

References

External links 
 Sackets Harbor Battlefield State Historic Site at NYS Office of Parks, Recreation and Historic Preservation 
   Tourism information
 Sackets Harbor Battlefield Alliance 
 Dick Case, "Researcher to shed light on African American’s contribution at Battle of Sackets Harbor during the War of 1812", Blog, Syracuse Post-Standard (syracuse.com), February 2012

Landmarks of the War of 1812
New York (state) historic sites
National Register of Historic Places in Jefferson County, New York
Military and war museums in New York (state)
Living museums in New York (state)
Museums in Jefferson County, New York
Parks in Jefferson County, New York
Museums of the War of 1812
Conflict sites on the National Register of Historic Places in New York (state)